Chris Galvin may refer to:

Chris Galvin (chef) (born 1958), English chef
Chris Galvin (footballer) (1951), English professional footballer
Christopher Galvin, American businessman